Jeffrey D. Johnson (born April 10, 1958) is an American politician and attorney who served as a member of Cleveland City Council for Ward 10 from 2014 to 2018. Johnson served as councilman for Ward 8 from 1984 to 1990 and as a member of the Ohio Senate from 1990 to 1998.

Early life and education 
Johnson was raised in the Collinwood neighborhood and graduated from Collinwood High School. He holds a bachelor's degree in communications from Kent State University and a Juris Doctor and a master's degree in political science from Case Western Reserve University.

Career 
Johnson was seen as a rising star in the Democratic Party in the 1990s, and announced his candidate to replace retiring Representative Louis Stokes in the U.S. House of Representatives in 1998. A few weeks after his announcement, however, he was indicted on federal charges of extortion. FBI agents said between 1994 and 1996 Johnson accepted $17,000 in campaign contributions and personal loans in exchange for using his influence to land state licenses for grocers. He was convicted in November 1998 and began his sentence in 2000 after losing an appeal, serving 15 months in prison and a halfway house.

Cleveland City Council 
In 1984, Johnson was appointed as Councilman for Ward 8 as then-councilman Michael White was appointed to the Ohio State Senate. Johnson was then elected as the Ward 8 Councilman 90 days later and re-elected in 1985 and 1989. Johnson was co-sponsor of the city's first Fair Housing Law and led the successful effort to establish Cleveland's Sex Crime and Child Abuse Investigative Unit in the Cleveland Police Department. During his tenure, the Ward 8 Glenville neighborhood received new economic and housing development projects including the Glenville Plaza, Eastside Market and Abyssinia Towers, a senior citizen apartment complex. Johnson was recognized and honored for his public service by local community groups.

Ohio Senate 
Johnson became an Ohio State Senator In January 1990 when he was appointed to the Senate following Senator White's election win for Mayor of Cleveland. During his nine years as Senator, Johnson sponsored a law creating the Ohio Infant Health Commission, and co-sponsored diverse legislation covering major issues including workplace discrimination, education reform, economic development, criminal justice reform and more. He led the successful fight to keep Central State University open in 1997 while serving as President of the Ohio Legislative Black Caucus (OLBC).

In 1998, Johnson was convicted of three counts of violating the Hobbs Act, the federal law prohibiting public officials from using their office to extort money. After serving 9 months, he completed a 4-month halfway house program in 2001. in 2002, Johnson was hired as an assistant to then Mayor Jane Campbell. He was promoted to the Mayor's Cabinet a year later as Director of the Department of Community Relations. During his years as director, Johnson was responsible for overseeing the city's police and community outreach initiative, mediation of neighborhood disputes, and implementation of the city's Fair Housing program. He was recognized by community groups for his leadership. After Mayor Campbell's election loss in 2005, Johnson started his company, Prime Strategy Group, a political consultant firm. In 2008, after citing his successful post-conviction career, he received from the Cuyahoga County Court of Common Pleas an expungement that sealed his record. In 2008, the Ohio Supreme Court unanimously reinstated his law license.

Return to Cleveland City Council 
Johnson became a candidate for the Cleveland Ward 8 City Council position in 2009, and was elected in November of that year. In 2013, he won again after being forced to seek reelection in a new redistricted Ward 10 after his previous ward was removed.

2017 Cleveland mayoral campaign

The Plain Dealer reported on January 16, 2017, that Johnson, in an interview, planned to run for Mayor of Cleveland. He made a formal announcement the next day. In the Nonpartisan blanket primary, Johnson placed third out of 11 candidates. After losing the election, Johnson became the Chief Housing Specialist at the Cleveland Housing Court.

2021 Ohio's 11th congressional district special election 
After Marcia Fudge was selected as Biden's nomination for Secretary of Housing and Urban Development, Johnson announced his candidacy for the special election to succeed her.

Personal life 
Johnson married his wife, Felicia, in 2015. He is a step-father to her two daughters from a previous marriage. In 2017, Felicia and her two daughters moved to the East Side of Cleveland. On January 12, 2021, a dissolution of the marriage was granted by Judge Diane M. Palos of the Cuyahoga County Domestic Relations Court.

References

External links 
Campaign website

|-

|-

|-

Living people
Cleveland City Council members
Democratic Party Ohio state senators
African-American state legislators in Ohio
Politicians convicted of extortion under color of official right
Ohio politicians convicted of crimes
21st-century American politicians
Kent State University alumni
Case Western Reserve University alumni
1958 births
21st-century African-American politicians
20th-century African-American people
Candidates in the 2021 United States elections